Andrej Šeban (born 23 June 1962) is a Slovak jazz fusion musician, composer, producer, studio guitarist, and instructor. He is also an occasional actor.

Life and career
Šeban was born in Bratislava in 1962. As a child, he took piano lessons and beginning in 1977, he took classical guitar lessons. The same year, he joined the band Nervy (where Martin Ďurinda sang and played guitar). From 1978 to 1979, he was a member of the jazz rock band Miting and in the early 1980s, he played with hard rock band Demikát. He joined the music faculty at Comenius University in 1986 and studied vocal performance. The same year, he wrote the score for the film Slané cukríky and briefly played in the groups Tristo hrmených and Burčiak with Pavol Habera.

After university, Šeban became a member of the army's artistic ensemble, where he met Richard Müller and became co-leader of the pop band Banket until 1990. He was also in Peter Lipa's Combo until 1989. From then until 1993, Šeban played with the fusion band Tutu. With his own ASH Band (also known as Esh Band and Andrej Šeban Band), he toured England in 1993. From 1992 to 1995, he was with the band Provisorium. In 1996, together with Lipa, he formed Lipa-Šeban Band, which toured England, Portugal, and Switzerland. He is a co-founder of the progressive rock band Free Faces. In 2006, together with Martin Krampl, he formed the band Chillpill. Presently, Šeban continues to perform with Andrej Šeban Band.

He appeared as an actor in the 1980 film Odveta (Revenge) by Ivan Hustava.

Partial discography

Solo
Studio albums
 Čo dom dal (1993)
 Andrej Šeban Band... (1997)
 Bezvetrie (2000)
 Sklony (2008)
 Časozber (2011)
 Improvizácie I. (2012) – supplement to the book Kadlečík & Štrpka by Ivan Kadlečík and Ivan Štrpka
 Bez slov (2012) – supplement to the book Andrej Šeban by photographer Ivan Zubaľ
 Triplet (2019) – triple album
 Rock and Roll z Rači (2020)

Live albums
 Andrej Šeban Band Live in Bratislava (2013)

Soundtracks
 Slané cukríky (1986)
 Karpatský les (1994)
 Plameň (1995)
 Vrana Florenťanka (1995)

with Banket
 Bioelektrovízia (1986)
 Druhá doba?! (1988)
 Vpred? (1990)

with Tutu
 Mr. Jazzman (1991)

with Free Faces
 Almost True Story (1998)
 La Belle Epoque (2001)

Others
 Baal with Richard Müller (1989)
 Stala Sa Nám Láska... with Burčiak (1989)
 Grejtst Hic with Demikát (1995)
 Milión bohov with Oskar Rózsa and Marcel Buntaj (1999)
 Kamakura with Oskar Rózsa and Marcel Buntaj (2000)
 Spaceboys Polymusic with Anton Kubasák (2005)
 Šeban – Godár – Breiner – Kolkovič with Vladimír Godár, Peter Breiner, and Jozef Kolkovič (2008)

References

External links
 
 
 Andrej Šeban's guitar school DVD
 Andrej Šeban discography on discogs.com

1962 births
Living people
Musicians from Bratislava
Slovak jazz guitarists